Chen Kai (born 20 January 1993) is a Chinese former footballer.

Club career
Having started his career in France with Metz, Chen returned to China to forge a career in the lower leagues.

Career statistics

Club
.

Notes

References

1993 births
Living people
People from Guiyang
Footballers from Guizhou
Chinese footballers
Association football defenders
China League One players
China League Two players
FC Metz players
Chengdu Tiancheng F.C. players
Nantong Zhiyun F.C. players
Chinese expatriate footballers
Chinese expatriate sportspeople in France
Expatriate footballers in France